Stanley Miasek (August 8, 1924 – October 18, 1989) was an American professional basketball player.

A 6'5" forward, Miasek played six seasons (1946–1950; 1951–1953) in the Basketball Association of America and National Basketball Association as a member of the Detroit Falcons, Chicago Stags, Baltimore Bullets, and Milwaukee Hawks. He averaged 10.6 points per game and 7.6 rebounds per game in his BAA/NBA career.

Miasek was one of the early stars of the NBA (known as the Basketball Association of America until 1949).  He ranked third in total points (895), fifth in total assists (93), and first in personal fouls (208) during the league's inaugural season.

BAA/NBA career statistics

Regular season

Playoffs

References

External links

1924 births
1989 deaths
American men's basketball players
Baltimore Bullets (1944–1954) players
Basketball players from New York City
Chicago Stags players
Detroit Falcons (basketball) players
Milwaukee Hawks players
Power forwards (basketball)
Small forwards